Simon's Town railway station is a Metrorail railway station in the town of Simon's Town on the Cape Peninsula; it is the southern terminus of the Southern Line. The station is located between Station Road (the M4) and the beach.

The railway line from Fish Hoek into Simon's Town is single-track, but the station itself has three tracks; one track is served by a side platform next to the station building on Station Road, while the other two are served by an island platform connected by a pedestrian subway.

There were no trains running on the 6.3 km final section of the Cape Town suburban line between Fish Hoek and Simon's Town from November 2009 until February 2011, due to unusually high tides that piled heaps of sand on the line and caused serious damage beyond Glencairn, where structure beneath the track was undermined.

Vicinity
 Naval Base Simon's Town
 Boulders Beach
 False Bay Yacht Club
 Jubilee Square

References 

Railway stations in Cape Town
Railway stations opened in 1890
Metrorail Western Cape stations